Michael Kevin Flynn (20 March 1939 – 16 January 2022) was an Irish rugby union player who represented the national team, earning 22 caps, and played at club level for Wanderers and Leinster. Flynn died in Dublin on 16 January 2022, at the age of 82.

References

1939 births
2022 deaths
Irish rugby union players
Wanderers F.C. (rugby union) players
Leinster Rugby players
Ireland international rugby union players
Rugby union players from Dublin (city)